Sid Ahmed Rachid (Arabic: سيد احمد رشيد; born 31 December 1998) is a Mauritanian professional footballer who plays as a defender for Super D1 club Nouakchott Kings and the Mauritania national team.

References 

1998 births
Living people
People from Nouakchott
Mauritanian footballers
Association football defenders

ASAC Concorde players
Nouakchott Kings players
Super D1 players
Mauritania international footballers